Eefde is a village in the Dutch province of Gelderland. It is located in the municipality of Lochem, about 3 km northeast of the city of Zutphen.

Overview 
It was first mentioned between 1294 and 1295 as Evede, and might relate to a sheep (English: ewe for female sheep). In 1840, it was home to 709 people. After World War II, it started to developed as a suburb of Zutphen.

There is a legend that Witte Wieven appear on that village every Christmas Eve, and dance on a Hill named Wittenwievenbult (Wise woman hill), after the white woman.

Gallery

References

Populated places in Gelderland
Lochem